Lungile Shongwe (born 1983) - South African film and theater actress. She is known for playing in a movie "In Desert and Wilderness" (2001) of a director Gavin Hood. In the film she starred alongside other South African actor, Mzwandile Ngubeni. In preparation for the role of Mea - just like Mzwandile Ngubeni - she had to learn Polish dialogues, although she did not know before the Polish language.

Filmography
 2001 In Desert and Wilderness - as Mea
 2001 In Desert and Wilderness (TV mini-series) - as Mea

References

External links
 Lungile Shongwe in Filmweb (PL)

South African film actresses
1983 births
Living people
South African stage actresses
21st-century South African actresses